Asir-e-Hirs is an Urdu play by Agha Hashar Kashmiri. It was published in 1900.

References

Plays by Agha Hashar Kashmiri
1900 plays
Urdu-language plays